Jordan Sigismeau (born 22 December 1992) is a French rugby league footballer who plays for the Palau XIII Broncos in the Elite One Championship He plays as a .

Club career
Born on the island of Réunion, Sigismeau originally played rugby union before switching to rugby league with Catalans in 2014. In 2015, he spent time on loan in the Championship with Whitehaven, making 6 appearances before being recalled by Catalans. Sigismeau made his Super League début later that year against Widnes Vikings.

International career
Jordan was selected for France for their 2015 European Cup campaign. He made his international début against Ireland in Albi in a game where the French won comfortably and which also saw Jordan score his first international try.

He also played for France in their mid-tournament test-match against England. He was a part what was considered a 'weakened' French side due to injury and it showed with an appalling showing against their opponents.

References

External links
Catalans Dragons profile (French)

1992 births
Catalans Dragons players
Whitehaven R.L.F.C. players
French rugby league players
French rugby union players
Sportspeople from Réunion
Rugby league wingers
Living people
Black French sportspeople
France national rugby league team players